The Mansion House was the official residence of the Mayor of Newport, South Wales until 2009. It also offered hospitality and accommodation to official visitors to the city from overseas. It is located in Stow Park Circle, a short distance west of the centre of Newport.

In 2010 plans were approved to convert the Mansion House for use as a register office and it duly opened in July 2011 after a major refurbishment.

History
The present grounds of the Mansion House were bought in four lots by John Liscombe, leather merchant and sadler of Commercial Street, Newport, between 1886 and 1889. He built the House in the early 1890s and used it as his personal residence until his death in November 1914. John Liscombe was Mayor of Newport in 1905 and his portrait can be seen at the bottom of the stairs in the hall. The portrait was given to the Mansion House by the original leather merchants and saddlers firm which still operates in Newport.

After a period of ownership by Sir Garrod Thomas of Clytha Park, the house was bought by Newport Corporation in March 1939 for £3,250 for use as judges' lodgings. Until 1940 the Monmouthshire Assizes were held at Monmouth, some 25 miles from Newport via a slow winding road. The quarter sessions were held at the Sessions House, Usk some 11 miles from Newport. As most of the business for the assizes and quarter sessions was provided by the inhabitants of Newport, there were many complaints about the inconvenience to witnesses and to the legal profession of the courts being located at Monmouth and Usk.

In 1936 Newport Corporation decided to build a new Civic Centre. At the time Newport had its own police force and was also responsible for providing magistrates' courts. It was therefore decided to add two courtrooms to the Clytha Park Road wing of the new building in order to enable the assizes and quarter sessions to be held in Newport.

A condition of the consent of the Lord Chancellor to this proposal was that Newport should provide judges' lodgings, and this was the reason for the purchase of the Mansion House. Arrangements were made at the time of the purchase of the Mansion House for it to be used by the mayor during the times in which it was not required by the judges.

The Courts Act 1971 abolished assizes and quarter sessions and introduced the single national Crown Court. The government included a clause in schedule 3 of the Courts Act to the effect that local authorities would cease to be under obligation to provide judges' lodgings after January 1975. From 1975 until 2009, it was used exclusively by the council as the official residence of the mayor. It was refurbished in 2011 and re-opened as the city's register office in July of that year.

Gallery

References

External links
Newport City Council

History of Newport, Wales
Houses in Newport, Wales
Mayors' mansions in the United Kingdom